Olga Ivanovna Kurban (born December 16, 1987 in Irkutsk) is a female heptathlete from Russia, who competed for her native country at the 2008 Summer Olympics, and the 2012 Summer Olympics in London.  She also competed at the 2007 World Athletics Championships.

International competitions

Professional competitions

See also
List of people from Irkutsk

References

sports-reference

1987 births
Living people
Sportspeople from Irkutsk
Russian heptathletes
Olympic heptathletes
Olympic athletes of Russia
Athletes (track and field) at the 2008 Summer Olympics
Athletes (track and field) at the 2012 Summer Olympics
World Athletics Championships athletes for Russia
Universiade gold medalists in athletics (track and field)
Universiade gold medalists for Russia
Medalists at the 2011 Summer Universiade
Russian Athletics Championships winners